This article lists events from the year 1737 in Ireland.

Incumbent
Monarch: George II

Events
 April 9 – William Cavendish, 3rd Duke of Devonshire, appointed Lord Lieutenant of Ireland in succession to Lionel Sackville, 1st Duke of Dorset (sworn 7 September).
 August 29 – proclamation reducing the ratio of gold to silver in coins of Ireland to conform with the British standard.
 September 1 – The News Letter is first published in Belfast by Francis Joy, making it the world's oldest existing English language newspaper.

Births
April 18 – William Hazlitt, Unitarian minister and writer (d. 1820)
May 2 – William Petty, 2nd Earl of Shelburne, British Whig statesman, Home Secretary in 1782 and Prime Minister 1782–1783 (d. 1805)
May 14 – George Macartney, 1st Earl Macartney, statesman, colonial administrator and diplomat (d. 1806)
Christopher Hewetson, sculptor (d. c.1798)
Joseph Wall, British army officer, colonial governor and murderer (d. 1802)

Deaths
August 7 – Hugh MacMahon, Roman Catholic Bishop of Clogher, later Archbishop of Armagh (b. 1660)
November – Sir Gerard Lally, Jacobite and French military officer.

References

 
Years of the 18th century in Ireland
Ireland
1730s in Ireland